Glenea myrsine is a species of beetle in the family Cerambycidae. It was described by Francis Polkinghorne Pascoe in 1867. It is known from Malaysia and Borneo.

References

myrsine
Beetles described in 1867